Fausta, was the mother of St. Anastasia of Sirmium. Fausta was a model mother having had the virtue raising a saintly daughter.

Fausta is one of the 140 Colonnade saints which adorn St. Peter's Square.

References

3rd-century Christian saints
People from Sirmium